Thomas Gordon Mitchell (August 22, 1944 – July 16, 2017) was a college and professional American football player. 

A 6'2", . tight end from Bucknell University and member of the Bucknell Athletics Hall of Fame, Mitchell played one season (1966) for the American Football League (AFL)'s Oakland Raiders, and ten seasons (1968–1977) in the National Football League (NFL) for the Baltimore Colts and the San Francisco 49ers. He was nicknamed "the Crocodile" and his pouring a pitcher of beer on the head of author George Plimpton is recounted in the book Mad Ducks and Bears. He died of cancer at the age of 72 in 2017. He was father-in-law to former Tampa Bay Buccaneers and current Rutgers head coach Greg Schiano, and grandfather to Bucknell defensive lineman Joe Schiano.

See also
Other American Football League players

References

1944 births
2017 deaths
Sportspeople from Newport, Rhode Island
American football tight ends
Bucknell Bison football players
Oakland Raiders players
Baltimore Colts players
San Francisco 49ers players
American Football League players
Players of American football from Rhode Island